Rudolf Seiters (born 13 October 1937 in Osnabrück) is a German politician of the CDU (Christian Democratic Union) party.

From 1989–1991, he was Federal Minister for Special Affairs and the Head of the Office of the German Chancellery. From 1991–1993, he was the Minister of the Interior. From 1998–2002, he was the Vice President of the German Bundestag, or Parliament. Since 2003, he has been the President of the German Red Cross.

Life and jobs
After graduating from the Gymnasium Carolinium in Osnabrück in 1959, Seiters graduated from the University of Münster with a degree in Jurisprudence, finishing his first examinations (roughly equivalent to bachelor's degree) in 1963, and his second examination (professional degree) in 1967. From 1968–1969, he was a legal assistant in the office of the Osnabrück Department of the Economy and Social Housing. Since November 2003, he has been the President of the German Red Cross.

He is married with three daughters and lives in Papenburg. In 2000, he was given an honorary doctorate from the Bundeswehr University Munich.

Party
Since 1958, he has been a member of the CDU. From 1963 until 1965, he was the Borough-president of the Osnabrück-Emsland chapter of the CDU youth organization Junge Union. Then, from 1965–1968, he was the president of the state chapter in Hannover and from 1968–1971 of the newly founded Lower Saxony chapter. From 1967–1971, he was furthermore a member of the Federal Executive Board of the Junge Union and then from 1971–1973 a member of the Federal Managing Board of the CDU itself. From 1972–1998, he was deputy secretary of the CDU in Lower Saxony and from 1992–1998 also a member of the CDU National Executive Committee.

As a representative
From 1969–2002, Seiters was a member of the German Parliament, the Bundestag. There, he served from 1971–1976 and from 1982–1984 as an Executive Officer (Geschäftsführer) of the CDU/CSU parliamentary fraction and from 1984–1989 he was the party fraction's Head Executive Officer. After the 1994 elections, he became the deputy Chair of the fraction, a position he retained until 1998 when he became Vice President of the Bundestag.

Prague embassy negotiations
In 1989, thousands of East Germans took refuge the Prague embassy of the Federal Republic of Germany. Rudolf Seiters successfully negotiated with the East German government (DDR) the passage of the embassy refugees to the Federal Republic of Germany.

Cabinet posts
Seiters was named on 21 April 1989 as the Federal Minister for Special Affairs and the Head of the Office of the German Chancellery. On 26 November 1991, he was appointed the Minister of the Interior. On 27 June 1993, in a German Police raid in the train station of the Mecklenburgian town of Bad Kleinen, both the wanted terrorist of the Red Army Faction (RAF), Wolfgang Grams, and a GSG 9 agent, Michael Newrzella, lost their lives. Seiters took responsibility for the raid and stepped down on 4 July 1993.

Cabinets
Seiters was a member of the Cabinet Kohl III and the Cabinet Kohl IV.

Awards
 In 2008 Dr. Seiters received the Dr. Rainer Hildebrandt Human Rights Award endowed by Alexandra Hildebrandt. The award is given annually in recognition of extraordinary, non-violent commitment to human rights.

References

External links
Photo and short biography in German

1937 births
Living people
German Red Cross personnel
Government ministers of Germany
Grand Crosses with Star and Sash of the Order of Merit of the Federal Republic of Germany
Heads of the German Chancellery
Interior ministers of Germany
Members of the Bundestag for Lower Saxony
Members of the Bundestag 1998–2002
Members of the Bundestag 1994–1998
Politicians from Osnabrück
Members of the Bundestag for the Christian Democratic Union of Germany